Parasapur is a village in Dharwad district of Karnataka, India.

Demographics 
As of the 2011 Census of India there were 272 households in Parasapur and a total population of 1,443 consisting of 757 males and 686 females. There were 236 children ages 0-6.

References

Villages in Dharwad district